Bergdalens IK is a Swedish football club located in Borås.

Background
Bergdalens IK's men's team currently plays in Division 4 Västergötland Södra which is the sixth tier of Swedish football. They play their home matches at the Björkängsvallen in Borås.

The club is affiliated to Västergötlands Fotbollförbund.

On 30 December 2022, the women's team announced its withdrawal from Elitettan for the 2023 season. The vacaent position was offered to BK Häcken FF's second team, which on 9 January 2023 accepted the offer.

Season to season

Footnotes

External links
 Official website
 Bergdalens IK on Facebook

Football clubs in Västra Götaland County